The orange clingfish (Diplocrepis puniceus) is a clingfish, the only species in the genus Diplocrepis. It is found all around New Zealand from low water to about 5 m, on rocky coastlines.  This species grows to a length of  SL.

References

 
 Tony Ayling & Geoffrey Cox, Collins Guide to the Sea Fishes of New Zealand,  (William Collins Publishers Ltd, Auckland, New Zealand 1982) 

Gobiesocidae
Endemic marine fish of New Zealand
Monotypic fish genera
Fish described in 1846